Milan Bor (1936 in Prague – 14 May 1998) was a German sound engineer. He was nominated for an Academy Award in the category Best Sound for the film Das Boot.

Selected filmography

 The Sternstein Manor (1976)
 The Swiss Conspiracy (1976)
 Vier gegen die Bank (1976, TV film)
 The American Friend (1977)
 The Serpent's Egg (1977)
 Fedora (1978)
 Despair (1978)
 The Marriage of Maria Braun (1978)
 From the Life of the Marionettes (1980)
 Berlin Alexanderplatz (1980, TV miniseries)
 Lili Marleen (1981)
 Das Boot (1981)
 Lola (1981)
 Dies rigorose Leben (1983)
 The Roaring Fifties (1983)
 The NeverEnding Story (1984)
 The Noah's Ark Principle (1984)
 Joey (1985)
 Enemy Mine (1985)
 Rosa Luxemburg (1986)
 The Name of the Rose (1986)
 The Aggression (1987)
 Lethal Obsession (1987)
 Der Unsichtbare (1987)
 Cobra Verde (1987)
 The Cat (1988)
 Autumn Milk (1988)
 The Nasty Girl (1990)
 Success (1991)
 Until the End of the World (1991)
 Gudrun (1992)
 Salt on Our Skin (1992)
 Stalingrad'' (1993)

References

External links

1936 births
1998 deaths
German audio engineers